Yasurō, Yasuro or Yasurou is a masculine Japanese given name.

Possible writings
Yasurō can be written using different combinations of kanji characters. Here are some examples:

康郎, "healthy, son"
康朗, "healthy, clear"
安郎, "tranquil, son"
安朗, "tranquil, clear"
保郎, "preserve, son"
保朗, "preserve, clear"
泰郎, "peaceful, son"
泰朗, "peaceful, clear"
易郎, "divination, son"
也寸郎, "to be, measurement, son"

The name can also be written in hiragana やすろう or katakana ヤスロウ.

Notable people with the name
, Japanese academic
, Japanese Go player

Japanese masculine given names